Ali Asghar Mosleh Fasaei (born 1962) (Persian: علی‌اصغر مصلح فسایی) is an Iranian philosopher and professor of philosophy at Allameh Tabataba'i University. He is known for his expertise on philosophy of culture. Mosleh holds the presidency of The Iranian Society of Intercultural Philosophy (ISIPH) and Research Institute for Contemporary Culture at Institute for Humanities and Cultural Studies. He was the Dean of ATU's Faculty of Persian Literature and Foreign Languages (PLFL), and Acting-Dean of ATU's Faculty of Theology and Islamic Knowledge (2015-2017).

Bibliography

As Author
 Mosleh, Ali Asghar (2020) Truth and power(Vol. 1)", Tehran: Nashre Ney
 
 Mosleh, Ali Asghar (2018) the Other; A Research on Intercultural Thought and the Ethics of Dialogue. Tehran: Elmi Publication
 Mosleh, Ali Asghar (2008) The Origin of Intercultural Insight and Philosophy Mosleh, Ali Asghar (2008) The Philosophies of Existence, Tehran: publishing organization for Institute of Islamic culture and Thought
 Mosleh, Ali Asghar (2013) Quest and Dialogue: Essays on Culture. Tehran: Elmi Publication
 Mosleh, Ali Asghar (2009) Frankfurt School's critical theory and a critique of modern culture 
 Mosleh, Ali Asghar (2013) Georg Wilhelm Friedrich Hegel, Tehran: Elmi Publication
 Mosleh, Ali Asghar (2014) Allameh Tabatabai`s “Edrakate Eetebari” and Philosophy of Culture, Tehran: Ruzegare No Publication
 Mosleh, Ali Asghar (2014) Tajrobeh Vahed (Single Experience), Tehran: Institute for humanities and cultural studies (IHCS) and Elmi Publication
 Mosleh, Ali Asghar (2015) Philosophy of Culture, Tehran: Elmi Publication
 Mosleh, Ali Asghar (2016), The Question concerning the truth of Man: A Comparative Study in Ibn al-Arabi`s and Heidegger`s Thought, Tehran: Taha Publication
 Mosleh, Ali Asghar (2011) A Discussion about the Future of Islamic Wisdom  
 Die Frage nach dem Verhältnis von Vernunft und Geschichte bei Hegel und Rumi, Hegel-Jahrbuch 2014 (1) doi:10.1515/hgjb-2014-0159

As Editor
 Mosleh, Ali Asghar (ed.) (2021) The possibility of Rereading intercultural philosophy in Rumi's thought with emphasis on the views of Adher Mall Mosleh, Ali Asghar (ed.) (2017) Proceedings of the International Conference on the Future of Culture, Tehran: Allameh Tabataba`I University Press
 Die Sehnsucht zum Wahren im Sufismus, In Guido Kreis & Joachim Bromand (eds.), Was Sich Nicht Sagen Lässt: Das Nicht-Begriffliche in Wissenschaft, Kunst Und Religion. Akademie Verlag. pp. 633–646 (2010)
 Mosleh, Ali Asghar (ed.) (2013) '''Non-Being' in Heidegger's Thought and Chinese Philosophy 
 Mosleh, Ali Asghar (ed.) (2014) Intercultural Philosophy & The Contemporary World, Tehran: Hekmat Publishing Company

See also 
Intellectual Movements in Iran
Iranian philosophy
Religious intellectualism in Iran

Sources

External links
 Mosleh at Institute for Humanities and Cultural Studies
 Personal Website
 List of Mosleh, Ali Asghar's published works on Abebooks
 Säkularisierungsprozesse - Prof. Dr. Ali Asghar Mosleh

Iranian writers
1962 births
Living people
University of Tehran alumni
Heidegger scholars
Philosophy academics
Existentialists
Hermeneutists
21st-century Iranian philosophers
Philosophers of culture
Continental philosophers
Phenomenologists
Nietzsche scholars
Philosophers of nihilism
Academic staff of Allameh Tabataba'i University
Tarbiat Modares University alumni
Faculty of Letters and Humanities of the University of Tehran alumni